Waleed Jassem Abdulla Jasemi (born on August 2, 1986) is a Qatari footballer. He plays as a midfielder for Lekhwiya. He is a member of the Qatar national football team.

Career
Jassem started his career with Al-Ahli under the supervision of coach Abdul Qader and blossomed into a focused player. At the end of the 2002–03 season, he transferred to Al-Rayyan after experiencing problems with the Ahli administration.

At Al-Rayyan, he highlighted his talent with many great international players like Fernando Hierro and Mario Basler. He was also able to put up a good partnership with Moroccan playmaker Boushaib el Mubaraki in the Rayyani midfield. In recent years after the departure of many stars Waleed became the backbone of the Rayyan team. Even though Waleed put up inspiring performances along with the likes of Jose Fumagalli and Youssef Mukhtari, Al-Rayyan could not succeed in the league. With so many disappointing seasons, in 2008, Waleed decided to move to Qatar Sports Club.

International career
Waleed played for Qatar in the Asian Youth Championship before breaking into the senior team. He made his debut for the senior national team in 2001, at the age of 15, becoming one of the youngest debuts in the history of the national team. His most important role for the team came in 2004 when he played a superb role in Qatar's road to Gulf Cup 17 glory. Though he played in the 2007 Asian Cup he failed to get into new coach Jorge Fossati's preferred line-up. Many fans were surprised why his exploits with Rayyan couldn't get him into the team.

Notes 

1986 births
Living people
Qatari footballers
Qatar international footballers
Lekhwiya SC players
Qatar SC players
Al Kharaitiyat SC players
Al-Rayyan SC players
Al Ahli SC (Doha) players
2007 AFC Asian Cup players
Qatar Stars League players
Qatari Second Division players
Asian Games medalists in football
Footballers at the 2006 Asian Games
Asian Games gold medalists for Qatar
Association football midfielders
Medalists at the 2006 Asian Games